The FC Porto swimming section was founded in 1908, and to this day is one of the most decorated swimming teams in Portugal. The club competes in Campeonato Nacional de Clubes em Natação (National Club Championship in Swimming) and has achieved multiple trophies both in the men and women departments.

The swimming section is part of the club heritage since its foundation, their first victory was the 'Taça Leixões' in 1908, and then the participation for the first time in the championship of Portugal occurred in 1919.

Names of famous athletes like Abel Guimarães, Adriano Antunes, Alexandrina Pinto, Alíria Silva, António Antunes, António Brenha, António Maria Pereira, Aristides Silva, Edgar Santos, Joaquim Lagoa, and so many others contributed for the club early success.

FC Porto achieved multiple national records, national, collective and individual titles, and attended at major international championships - European and World Championships.

Honours
The section is one of the most decorated in Portuguese competitions, holding the record for most domestic league titles in the former absolut format (held from 1978 to 1986) and also in the women's department and the Portuguese cup (performance variant).

Portuguese Championship (Absolut) (6) – record
1979–80, 1980–81, 1981–82, 1983–84, 1984–85, 1985–86

Portuguese Championship (Men) (4)
1987–88, 1990–91, 1991–92, 1998–99

Portuguese Championship (Women) (15) – record
1988–89, 1989–90, 1990–91, 1991–92, 1993–94, 1997–98, 1999–00, 2008–09, 2009–10, 2010–11, 2011–12, 2012–13, 2013–14, 2014–15, 2015–16

Portuguese Cup (Performance) (6) – record
2008–09, 2009–10, 2010–11, 2011–12, 2012–13, 2014–15

Portuguese Cup (Formation) (1)
2016–17

Olympic athletes
In the olympics several athletes from the club stood out like Paulo Frischknecht (Montreal '76), Mabílio Albuquerque, Rui Borges and Sergio Esteves (Seoul '88), Joana Soutinho and Miguel Machado (Atlanta '96), Paulo Trindade (Seoul '88, Barcelona '92 and Atlanta '96), Mário Carvalho (Sydney '2000), Luís Monteiro (Athens '2004) and Sara Oliveira (Beijing '2008 and London '2012).

Current squads

Men's squad

Seniors

  Carlos Santos
  Diogo Costa
  João Ascensão
  Luís Soares
  Samuel Belo
  Sérgio Baptista
  Tomás Silva

Juniors

  Diogo Santos
  Rafael Lino
  Tiago Soares
  Tomás Borges

Women's squad

Seniors

  Sara Oliveira
  Paula Oliveira
  Rosa Oliveira
  Mafalda Oliveira
  Maria Teresa Amorim

Juniors

  Ana Faria
  Íris Santos
  Maria Francisca Cabral
  Bárbara Magalhães
  Beatriz Silva
  Isabel Pego
  Maria Costa

Current staff

References

External links
Official website
 Porto Natação 

FC Porto
1908 establishments in Portugal
Swimming in Portugal
Swimming clubs